The Long Sword dance is a hilt-and-point sword dance recorded mainly in Yorkshire, England. The dances are usually performed around Christmas time and were believed to derive from a rite performed to enable a fruitful harvest.

Long Sword or Longsword?
The Morris Ring refer to the dance tradition as 'longsword'  as do EFDSS. However the Goathland Plough Stots website states that "The Goathland Plough Stots is one of Yorkshires traditional long sword teams, if not the oldest still dancing their own dance as performed as far back as the early 19th century".

History
The Long Sword dance is related to the rapper sword dance of Northumbria, but the character is fundamentally different as it uses rigid metal or wooden swords, rather than the flexible spring steel rappers used by its northern relation.

Cecil Sharp and other 20th Century folklorists believed that the dances originated from a religious or magical ceremony that was performed around Plough Monday to promote fertile soil; later researchers have cast doubt on such findings. They were banned under Oliver Cromwell, but revived when the monarchy was restored under Charles II.

Location
Long Sword dances are most commonly found in Yorkshire, with particular concentrations of dances in East Cleveland, the northern part of the North York Moors and around Sheffield. Outliers were also recorded in other parts of northern and eastern England, including Lincolnshire, Nottinghamshire, Derbyshire, Lancashire, Northumberland and County Durham (particularly Teesdale).

Style

Long Sword dances vary in the way they are performed, with some being slow and militaristic, such as the Grenoside or performed with pace and speed like Handsworth dances from near Sheffield. Others have different features including variations of numbers of dancers and distinctive movements.

Performances
Unlike many traditional dances in England, which are mainly performed by revival teams, Long Sword dances are often still performed by their own village teams, such as Grenoside Sword Dancers, the Goathland Plough Stots and Flamborough Sword Dancers. These teams generally maintain the traditions of their dances, such as traditional performances on Boxing Day or Plough Monday.

In addition to performances by traditional longsword teams in their own location longsword teams also appear at folk festivals such as the Sidmouth Folk Festival and the Beverley Folk Festival.

Dedicated longsword festivals have also been held in the UK. The International Sword Spectacular took place in Whitby, England, in May 2004 and was held again in York in May 2008.

Gallery
Some photographs of Grenoside Sword Dancers performing the Grenoside Sword dance on Boxing Day, the traditional day the dance is performed.

References

Sources

External links 
 International Sword Spectacular 2004
 World Millennium Sword Spectacular
 The Sword Dance Union
 Grenoside Sword Dancers
 Newcastle Kingsmen
 Spen Valley Longsword
 Bishop Gundulf's Morris
 Lingdale Primrose – archive photos, press cuttings and other material
 Star Of Swords Sword Dance

Morris dance
English folk dance